Madre Luna (Mother Moon) is a Spanish-language telenovela produced by the United States-based television network Telemundo and RTI Colombia.  This limited-run series,  also known as Grains of Love, debuted on July 2, 2007.  Veteran telenovela writer Julio Jiménez developed the story as a vehicle for star Amparo Grisales.  The show scored a 35 percent share of the  Colombian audience during the summer of 2007. During November 2007, it averaged 571,000 core adult (ages 18–49) viewers.

Luna's final episode aired Monday, January 28, 2008.

Story
This romantic melodrama features Alejandra Aguirre (Amparo Grisales), a gorgeous, tenacious woman with an amazingly well-preserved body who grows rice in the rural town of Castellón—and hides a deep, shocking secret. She is a 50-year-old woman with great passion, sensuality and splendor.  Her self-willed intensity puts her in the middle of a rivalry between Leonardo Cisneros (Gabriel Porras) and his handsome, daring son Ángel (Michel Brown). Both dashing men want to possess this vivacious heroine.

Leonardo is Alejandra's old flame, who gave her two energetic children, Valentin and Demetrio. He reappears in her life after many years of absence and revives the strong feelings which she thought had died long ago.  This turns her whole life upside down, forcing her to face her past.

Years before, Leonardo met Alejandra during a business trip and they fell in love.  He never told his unsuspecting lover that he had been married to his cruel, calculating wife Flavia (Mónica Dionne), who is the mother of his son Ángel, for three years.  Instead, he chose to live a double life of deception.

Not knowing the truth, Alejandra discovered that she was pregnant.  When she finally discovered Leonardo's deception, she broke off the relationship.  She chose to keep her silence rather than risk hurting his family. While she accepts a plot of land in Castellón from Leonardo, she avoids him for years before serendipity brings them back together.

Alejandra's reappearance sends a jolt of passion through Leonardo's heart. This also raises hatred and envy in vengeful people who want Alejandra and her children destroyed.  These dangerous enemies include Doña Trinidad Zapata (Saby Kamalich), Flavia's tyrannical mother, and the villainous Tirso Reinoso (Paulo Quevedo), who oversees the Cisneros property, along with the scheming Commandante Veneno ("Captain Venom") (Mauricio Aspe), who leads a group of thugs called the Sierra Brigade.

Meanwhile, the younger generation faces its own fight for love, companionship and fulfillment.  Leonardo's son Angel falls for Alejandra, knowing nothing of her forbidden secrets.  Despite the enormous age difference, Angel becomes so obsessed that he tries to take her by force.  This provokes Alejandra's strong desire to stand up against anyone who would abuse her or her children.

Leonardo's other sons are also adults with their own conflicts. Valentin now works on the rice farm and Demetrio attends college.  These two find themselves competing for the love of Flavia's beautiful young niece, Anabel Saldaña (Ana Lucía Domínguez).

All this leads both families down a path to intrigue, desperation, and betrayal.  Generational  and status conflicts converge.  The struggle over love and family and between rich arrogant upper-class families and poor, decent farmers pushes both Alejandra and Leonardo to their limits.

Title
The name Madre Luna refers to a family character in the children's stories that Alejandra told her sons when they were growing up.  Telemundo's English promotional copy says that the luna (moon) represents the two heroines.  Alejandra and Anabel lead the story toward its emotional climaxes just as the phases of the moon direct "ancient feminine mysteries.".

Production
Madre Luna is the last Telemundo-produced telenovela filmed in NTSC resolution.  Variety called the show "exquisitely lensed," featuring "bronzed bodies, revealing dresses, hacienda lust and luxury, and pop scoring". Madre Luna is shot in Colombia and vehicles in the show bear yellow Colombian license plates.  Jiménez said the setting is an imaginary locale inspired by Colombia's rice fields   Despite the setting, Telemundo made product placement deals to promote Windex, Splenda and other U.S. brands during the show.

In addition, Telemundo is expected to air 130 hours of Madre Luna from Monday to Friday over about six months.  As with most of its soap operas, the network broadcasts English subtitles as closed captions on CC3. This show replaced Marina in Telemundo's 8 p.m. ET/PT time slot.

Changes
When Telemundo announced Madre Luna in May, 2006, the story was different.  Grisales was to play a character named Leonor Aguirre.  When her husband dies, she returns home to Castellón to face her troubled past and protect her family honor. She falls madly in love with a charming man half her age.

The villain in this story was Isadora, who believes Leonor was once romantically involved with her husband.  So she plots to expose Leonor's dark secret and ruin her family's reputation  Isadora spreads a hideous rumor around town, provoking irate villagers to attack Leonor's home and kill her eldest son. The novela was to focus on Leonor's quest to rise from the ashes and avenge her son's tragic death.

Actor Javier Gómez was originally cast in a major role in this series, but he went over to another Telemundo soap, Sin Vergüenza, instead.

Cast

Broadcasters

References

External links
 Madre Luna page (English, requires Flash)
 Telenovela World (bilingual)
  (Spanish)
 Only Amparo Grisales Can Be Madre Luna (Spanish article in La Opinion)
 Madre Luna in RCN TV (Colombia)

2007 telenovelas
2008 telenovelas
2007 American television series debuts
2008 American television series endings
2007 Colombian television series debuts
2008 Colombian television series endings
Colombian telenovelas
RTI Producciones telenovelas
Spanish-language American telenovelas
Telemundo telenovelas